The Tomb of Prophet Noah or Noah's Mausoleum is a mausoleum in the city of Nakhchivan, Azerbaijan. Architecture of the construction is dated from the 8th century. As according to Armenian tradition, Nakhchivan was founded by Noah.

Noah's tomb is located in the town of Nakhchivan. 19th century Russian and European sources such as the Brockhaus and Efron Encyclopedic Dictionary and John Foster Fraser noted that the local Armenians considered it a holy place. James Theodore Bent in his 1986 The Contemporary Review described the site as a popular Christian Armenian shrine.

The current mausoleum was built in 2006. The tomb consists of remains of the lower storey of a former temple. There is a ladder leading to a burial vault. There is a stone column in the middle of the vault. According to legend, relics of Noah are under this column. A portrait describing the mausoleum of Noah 100 years ago painted by Bahruz Kangarli is saved in the National Art Museum of Azerbaijan.

Gallery

See also
 İlandağ of the Lesser Caucasus
 Nuh

References

External links

 
 

Buildings and structures completed in the 8th century
Tomb of Noah
Nakhchivan (city)
Mausoleums in Azerbaijan
Tourist attractions in Azerbaijan
Tourist attractions in Nakhchivan